Tammy R. Exum is a teacher and politician from Connecticut. She is a member of the Connecticut House of Representatives since 2019, when she won the special election. Formerly, she was a member and later the Vice Chair of the West Hartford, Connecticut Board of Education. She was also very active in the school community working the PTA and more. She is a member of the Democratic Party.

Early life
Exum earned a bachelor's degree in Early Childhood Education and a master's degree in Business Administration.

Career
Exum was a public school teacher. Later, she was elected to the West Hartford, Connecticut Board of Education.

Connecticut House of Representatives
Since 2019, Exum has been a member of the, Administration and Elections Committee, 
Environment Committee, and the Banking Committee, all in the Connecticut House of Representatives. In Exum's State Representative district, she represents part of Avon, Connecticut, Farmington, Connecticut, and West Hartford, Connecticut.

Elections
In 2013, Exum announced her Board of Education candidacy by a YouTube Video. In the 2019 Special Election, Exum beat Republican Robert Margolis by 30%. She was reelected in 2020. She is unchallenged.

Personal life
She lives with her husband, Earl Exum, and three children in West Hartford, Connecticut.

References

Democratic Party members of the Connecticut House of Representatives
Politicians from Hartford, Connecticut
Women state legislators in Connecticut
Year of birth missing (living people)
Living people
21st-century American educators
21st-century American women politicians
20th-century American educators
School board members in Connecticut
21st-century American politicians
Schoolteachers from Connecticut
20th-century American women educators
21st-century American women educators